Tetropium schwerdtfegeri is a species of beetle in the family Cerambycidae. It was described by Franz in 1955.

References

Spondylidinae
Beetles described in 1955